Douglas C. Kistler (March 21, 1938 – February 29, 1980) was an American basketball player. He attended Radnor High School in Wayne, Pennsylvania.

A 6'9" (2.06 m), 210 lb (95 kg) power forward, Kistler played at Duke University from 1959 to 1961, earning the ACC men's basketball tournament Most Valuable Player Award in 1960. Kistler was selected by the Detroit Pistons in the 3rd round (3rd pick, 26th overall) of the 1961 NBA Draft. He played five games for the New York Knicks during the 1961–62 NBA season and averaged 1.6 points per game.

Kistler died in an automobile accident in Charlotte, North Carolina in 1980.

References

1938 births
1980 deaths
American men's basketball players
Basketball players from Pennsylvania
Detroit Pistons draft picks
Duke Blue Devils men's basketball players
New York Knicks players
Power forwards (basketball)
Road incident deaths in North Carolina